Michael Christopher Minter (born January 15, 1974) is an American football coach and former player. He is the head football coach at Campbell University in Buies Creek, North Carolina, a position he has held since the 2013 season. Minter played professionally as a safety in the National Football League (NFL) for ten seasons, from 1997 to 2006, with the Carolina Panthers. He played college football at University of Nebraska–Lincoln and was selected by the Panthers in the second round of the 1997 NFL Draft.

High school and college
Minter attended Lawton High School in Lawton, Oklahoma where he started as running back and free safety. As a running back, he led the state with 1,589 yards rushing and 21 touchdowns on 187 carries as a senior. Minter also averaged 21 points per game in basketball. Minter then attended the University of Nebraska, where he was a member of both national championship teams of 1994 and 1995. He redshirted as a true freshman, and played backup safety his freshman year despite recording 21 tackles, two forced fumbles, and one sack. Sophomore year, Minter started the first two games of the season at free safety before tearing his left ACL, which took him out for the rest of the season. He played a key role as the starting strong safety for the 1995 national championship winning team, the first to win consensus back-to-back national championships in 40 years. He recorded 53 tackles, two interceptions, and deflected six passes. This earned him All-Big Eight second-team recognition. In his senior season, Minter started and played the first ten games at safety before moving to linebacker for the final two. He amassed 51 tackles, five interceptions, six deflected passes, and five quarterback rushes, which earned him All-Big 12 first-team honors.

NFL career
Minter was selected 56th overall by the Carolina Panthers in the second round of the 1997 NFL Draft. He became the starter in the team's sixth game of his rookie season, and remained there until his retirement. In his rookie year he posted 11 starts and finished second among defensive backs with 83 tackles, and also recorded 3.5 sacks, two fumble recoveries, two forced fumbles, 10 passes defensed and four quarterback hurries. In 1998, Minter missed ten games because of a staph infection that developed as a complication of surgery on his left knee. Following that season, Minter started every game of each year, except in 2001, when he missed the first two games because of an injury. In Carolina's appearance in the Super Bowl against the New England Patriots in 2003, Minter ranked second on defense and equaled a career-high of 18 tackles. Despite breaking his left foot in the third quarter, he stayed in the rest of the game.

In his 10 years in the NFL, all with the Panthers, Minter made 790 tackles, 9.5 sacks, 15 forced fumbles, 8 fumble recoveries, 15 interceptions, a franchise-record 421 return yards, and 4 defensive touchdowns, including a franchise-record-tying 2 in 2003.

On March 27, 2007, the NFL Network reported that the 2007 season would be Minter's last. ESPN.com reported that Minter retired after 10 seasons.

On August 7, 2007 Minter announced his retirement, effective immediately (as reported in The Charlotte Observer). His decision to retire early was attributed to continuing problems with his knees. Minter retired with team records for game starts (141) and consecutive starts (94), as well as for fumble recoveries and interceptions resulting in touchdowns.

Regular season

After the NFL
Minter declared in 2009 that he was considering a run for the United States House of Representatives in 2010 as a Republican against incumbent Larry Kissell; however, he decided against running.

Minter had shown interest in being the first head coach of the Charlotte 49ers football team, which began play in 2013. The position, however, went to Brad Lambert, who previously served as an assistant coach at Oklahoma, Marshall, and Georgia. After spending one season as an assistant coach at Johnson C. Smith University in 2011, Minter was hired to serve as the special teams coach at Liberty University in January 2012. On November 26, 2012, Minter became the head football coach at Campbell University in Buies Creek, North Carolina.

Minter also coached three seasons at First Assembly Christian School in Concord, North Carolina, where he won two state championships.

Head coaching record

College

References

External links
 Campbell profile
 

1974 births
Living people
American football safeties
Campbell Fighting Camels football coaches
Carolina Panthers players
Johnson C. Smith Golden Bulls football coaches
Liberty Flames football coaches
Nebraska Cornhuskers football players
High school football coaches in North Carolina
North Carolina Republicans
Sportspeople from Cleveland
Sportspeople from Lawton, Oklahoma
Coaches of American football from Oklahoma
Players of American football from Cleveland
Players of American football from Oklahoma
African-American coaches of American football
African-American players of American football
Ed Block Courage Award recipients